Shelter Cove is a census-designated place in Humboldt County, California. It lies at an elevation of 138 feet (42 m). Shelter Cove is on California's Lost Coast where the King Range meets the Pacific Ocean. A nine-hole golf course surrounds the one-runway Shelter Cove Airport at the center of Shelter Cove's commercial district. Utilities are provided by the Humboldt County Resort Improvement District #1 and boating access to the sea is managed by the Humboldt Bay Harbor, Recreation & Conservation District. The population was 803 at the 2020 census.

Shelter Cove shares a ZIP code (95589) with the hamlet of Whitethorn, California, located to the southeast. The community is inside area code 707. There are also parks such as Black Sands Beach, Mal Coombs Park, Seal Rock Picnic Area and Abalone Point. Much of the land around Shelter Cove is in the King Range National Conservation Area, managed by the Bureau of Land Management. Cove amenities include hiking trails, a community center, deli, coffee shop, restaurants, multiple inns, a general store, and several gift shops. Other amenities in Shelter Cove include a small aircraft airstrip, a boat launch, and RV parking.

History
The area around Shelter Cove was originally home to Native Americans known as the Sinkyone people.

Near Shelter Cove on July 21, 1907, the coastal passenger steamer Columbia collided with the steam schooner San Pedro amidst dense fog. The Columbia subsequently sank, killing 88 people. Although badly damaged, San Pedro stayed afloat and helped to rescue Columbia'''s survivors.

Because of the very steep terrain on the coastal areas surrounding Shelter Cove, the highway builders constructing State Route 1 (the "Shoreline Highway") decided it was too difficult to build the coastal highway along a long stretch of what is now the Lost Coast.

As a result of its seclusion, the Shelter Cove area has become a popular spot for those seeking quiet vacation respite or retirement area.  Popular activities in the area include fishing, whale watching, hiking, diving for abalone, and other outdoor activities.

The Cape Mendocino Light, a lighthouse from Cape Mendocino, was moved by helicopter to Mal Coombs Park in 1998. A post office operated at Shelter Cove from 1892 to 1933, moving in 1898.

Demographics

The 2010 United States Census reported that Shelter Cove had a population of 693. The racial makeup of Shelter Cove was 630 (90.9%) White, 3 (0.4%) African American, 5 (0.7%) Native American, 7 (1.0%) Asian, 1 (0.1%) Pacific Islander, 13 (1.9%) from other races, and 34 (4.9%) from two or more races. Hispanic or Latino of any race were 47 persons (6.8%).

The Census reported that 693 people (100% of the population) lived in households, 0 (0%) lived in non-institutionalized group quarters, and 0 (0%) were institutionalized.

There were 348 households, out of which 76 (21.8%) had children under the age of 18 living in them, 127 (36.5%) were opposite-sex married couples living together, 28 (8.0%) had a female householder with no husband present, 26 (7.5%) had a male householder with no wife present.  There were 47 (13.5%) unmarried opposite-sex partnerships, and 3 (0.9%) same-sex married couples or partnerships. 132 households (37.9%) were made up of individuals, and 32 (9.2%) had someone living alone who was 65 years of age or older. The average household size was 1.99.  There were 181 families (52.0% of all households); the average family size was 2.48.

The population was spread out, with 118 people (17.0%) under the age of 18, 25 people (3.6%) aged 18 to 24, 214 people (30.9%) aged 25 to 44, 234 people (33.8%) aged 45 to 64, and 102 people (14.7%) who were 65 years of age or older.  The median age was 43.1 years.  For every 100 females age 18 and over, there were 118.6 males.

The homeowner vacancy rate was 10.6%; the rental vacancy rate was 13.8%.  499 people (72.0% of the population) lived in owner-occupied housing units and 194 people (28.0%) lived in rental housing units.

Politics

Climate
Shelter Cove has a warm-summer Mediterranean climate (Köppen Csb'') typical of the North Coast, that is characterized by warm (but not hot), dry summers, and mild to chilly rainy winters. In Shelter Cove's case, the climate is moderated by the proximity to the Pacific Ocean, with small temperature variations on average throughout the year, which results in mild year-round temperatures, although some winter months can get quite cool at times. Shelter Cove on average has very wet winters and dry summers, also representative for the region. Temperatures of above  are very rare, happening on average 1-2 times per season, but temperatures approaching  or above have still been measured over such a wide time period as from April to October. For being a coastal community north of the Bay Area, Shelter Cove has quite mild winter temperatures and warm summers.

See also
 
 SS Columbia (1880)

References

External links

Humboldt County Resort Improvement District #1
Information on the Sinkyone peoples, California Coastal Conservancy
Shelter Cove/Lost Coast Wilderness, Bureau of Land Management - US Dept. of the Interior.
Lost Coast Connections at Shelter Cove

Populated coastal places in California
Census-designated places in Humboldt County, California
Ports and harbors of California
Census-designated places in California